The 1949–50 season was Chelsea Football Club's thirty-sixth competitive season. The club finished 13th in the First Division for the second consecutive season. They also reached the semi-finals of the FA Cup, where they lost to Arsenal after a replay.

Table

References

External links
 1949–50 season at stamford-bridge.com

1949–50
English football clubs 1949–50 season